The Clean Neighbourhoods and Environment Act 2005 (c 16) is an Act of the Parliament of the United Kingdom. It implements proposals contained in the Clean Neighbourhoods consultation launched on 25 July 2004.

Section 108 - Commencement
The following orders have been made under this section:
The Clean Neighbourhoods and Environment Act 2005 (Commencement No. 1) Order 2005 (S.I. 2005/1675 (C. 69))
The Clean Neighbourhoods and Environment Act 2005 (Commencement No. 2, Transitional Provisions and Savings) (England and Wales) Order 2005 (S.I. 2005/2896 (C. 122))
The Clean Neighbourhoods and Environment Act 2005 (Commencement No.2, Transitional Provisions and Savings) (England and Wales) (Amendment) Order 2006 (S.I. 2006/1002 (C. 31))
The Clean Neighbourhoods and Environment Act 2005 (Commencement No. 3) Order 2005 (S.I. 2005/3439 (C. 144))
The Clean Neighbourhoods and Environment Act 2005 (Commencement No. 4) Order 2006 (S.I. 2006/656 (C. 16))
The Clean Neighbourhoods and Environment Act 2005 (Commencement No. 5) Order 2008 (S.I. 2008/956 (C. 47))
The Clean Neighbourhoods and Environment Act 2005 (Commencement No. 1, Transitional and Savings Provisions) (England) Order 2006 (S.I. 2006/795 (C. 19))
The Clean Neighbourhoods and Environment Act 2005 (Commencement No. 2) (England) Order 2006 (S.I. 2006/1361 (C. 46))
The Clean Neighbourhoods and Environment Act 2005 (Commencement No. 3)(England) Order 2006 (S.I. 2006/2006 (C. 69)
The Clean Neighbourhoods and Environment Act 2005 (Commencement No. 4) (England) Order 2007 (S.I. 2007/390 (C. 15))
The Clean Neighbourhoods and Environment Act 2005 (Commencement No. 1 and Savings) (Wales) Order 2006 (S.I. 2006/768 (W. 75) (C. 18))
The Clean Neighbourhoods and Environment Act 2005 (Commencement No. 2, Transitional Provisions and Savings) (Wales) Order 2006 (S.I. 2006/2797 (W. 236) (C. 93)
The Clean Neighbourhoods and Environment Act 2005 (Commencement No. 3) (Wales) Order 2007 (S.I. 2007/3371 (W. 298))
The Statutory Nuisances (Miscellaneous Provisions) (Wales) Order 2007 (S.I. 2007/120 (W. 10))

References
Halsbury's Statutes,

External links
The Clean Neighbourhoods and Environment Act 2005, as amended from the National Archives.
The Clean Neighbourhoods and Environment Act 2005, as originally enacted from the National Archives.
Explanatory notes to the Clean Neighbourhoods and Environment Act 2005.

United Kingdom Acts of Parliament 2005
Environmental law in the United Kingdom